Lachnostoma is an extinct genus from a well-known class of fossil marine arthropods, the trilobites. It lived during the early part of the Arenig stage of the Ordovician Period, a faunal stage which lasted from approximately 478 to 471 million years ago.

References

Asaphida genera
Asaphidae
Ordovician trilobites
Fossils of Canada
Fossils of the United States
Paleozoic life of Alberta
Paleozoic life of British Columbia